Walter Cromer (fl. 1543) was a doctor to Henry VIII of England.

As Cromer was Scottish, when Henry began the Rough Wooing in 1543, Cromer was commissioned to teach Henry personally about Scotland's geography.

References

16th-century Scottish people
Henry VIII
16th-century English medical doctors
Rough Wooing